Ceremony is the third studio album by Japanese alternative rock band King Gnu. It was released on January 15, 2020, by Ariola Japan. All songs were composed by the group's frontman, Daiki Tsuneta. Built on the group's alternative rock sound, the album's genre-spanning production incorporates hip hop, soul, and classical. Ceremony was a commercial success, peaking atop the Japanese Oricon albums chart, the Billboard Japan albums chart, and was one of the 10 best-selling albums of 2020 worldwide.

Release 
Ceremony was released on January 15, 2020, by Ariola Japan. It was available on two formats: CD, and CD+Blu-ray. Ceremony, along with King Gnu's previous studio albums Tokyo Rendez-Vous and Sympa, was released on vinyl on December 2, 2020.

Awards 
Ceremony was one of the award-winning albums at the 2021 CD Shop Awards. It was one of the "five best albums" at the 2021 Japan Gold Disc Awards.

Commercial performance 
Ceremony debuted at number one on the Japanese Oricon albums chart, with first-week sales of 238,000 physical copies and 30,000 digital copies. The album spent 18 weeks in the top 10 of Billboard Japan Hot Albums Chart, including four weeks at number one on the component Download Albums Chart.

Track listing

Charts

Weekly charts

Year-end charts

Certifications and sales

References 

2020 albums
Ariola Japan albums